Carlos Fortes (born 27 April 1974) is a Dutch former football forward. He made his debut in Dutch professional football on 31 May 1993 for Sparta Rotterdam, replacing Gerald Sandel in a league game against Roda JC (2-4).

References
Fortes on Ronald Zwiers
VI Profile

Living people
1974 births
Dutch footballers
Association football forwards
Sparta Rotterdam players
SBV Vitesse players
Eredivisie players
Eerste Divisie players
Footballers from Rotterdam